Wicked Cyclone (formerly Cyclone) is a steel roller coaster located at Six Flags New England amusement park. The ride originally opened as a wooden roller coaster named Cyclone on June 24, 1983. Its name and design were inspired by the historic 1927 Cyclone roller coaster located at Coney Island. In 2014, after 32 seasons, Cyclone was closed while being re-tracked with steel. It reopened as Wicked Cyclone on May 24, 2015.

History
In 1983, Riverside Amusement Park decided to open a wooden roller coaster named the Riverside Cyclone. The ride was the second full-sized roller coaster to open at the park since its re-opening in 1940, following the installation of Thunderbolt in 1941. The $2.5 million Riverside Cyclone was designed by William Cobb & Associates and built by the Frontier Construction Company. The ride officially opened to the public on June 25, 1983, with Cobb as well as Norm Howells from Frontier Construction in attendance. The opening of Riverside Cyclone was expected to increase park attendance by more than 10% to 1 million annual visitors.

During its first season of operation, Riverside Cyclone featured two trains from Philadelphia Toboggan Coasters (PTC) where riders were restrained via a lap bar. Part-way through the first season, shoulder belts were added; however, these were removed prior to its second season. During its second season, the ride's trains were damaged, forcing the park to combine parts from both trains to form a single operational train. Two new replacement trains were purchased from D. H. Morgan Manufacturing in 1985.

In the late 1990s, Premier Parks (later Six Flags) purchased Riverside Amusement Park. Over a period of four years, approximately $100 million was invested in the renovation and expansion of the park, culminating in its rebranding to Six Flags New England in 2000. As a result, the Riverside branding was dropped, with the ride being renamed to the Cyclone. The D.H. Morgan Manufacturing trains were replaced with two PTC trains.

A refurbishment of the Cyclone in 2011 saw Topper Track from Rocky Mountain Construction added to sections of the ride. Topper Track is steel plating that replaces the upper layers of laminated wooden track. This track style is designed to reduce the maintenance typically required for a wooden roller coaster and provide a smoother ride experience.

Conversion to steel track
Over the years, the popularity of Cyclone began to decline. In June 2014, Six Flags New England announced that the ride would close permanently on July 20, 2014. A closing ceremony and farewell celebration was held on its last day of operation. Enthusiasts, including members of American Coaster Enthusiasts, were onboard for the media shoot, as John Winkler and the mayor of Agawam hosted a small ceremony to cut the cake. Fireworks were set off that night during the last ride, with wait times to ride reaching 90 minutes long. After the last rides were given, Six Flags showcased a future announcement scheduled in August using construction signs and a sandwich board near Cyclone's entrance. During its 31 seasons in operation as a wooden coaster, Cyclone was ridden by more than 15 million riders. The decision to close the ride was made over a period of one and half years.

On August 28, 2014, it was announced that Cyclone would undergo a transformation into Wicked Cyclone, converting its wooden track to steel. Dubbed a hybrid coaster, it is the first hybrid on the East Coast, and the only one to feature a 200-degree stall and two Zero G Rolls. The ride reopened as Wicked Cyclone in May 2015.

Characteristics

Reception

References

External links
 Wicked Cyclone at Rocky Mountain Construction

Roller coasters in Massachusetts
Roller coasters operated by Six Flags
Six Flags New England
2015 establishments in Massachusetts
Hybrid roller coasters